Senegalia caraniana is a species of plant in the family Fabaceae. It is found only in Somalia. It is threatened by habitat loss.

References

caraniana
Near threatened plants
Endemic flora of Somalia
Taxonomy articles created by Polbot